Siege of Amida may refer to:

Siege of Amida (359) during the Persian–Roman wars
Siege of Amida (502–503) during the Persian–Roman wars

See also
Ferret Music, partnered with Siege of Amida Records